Timothy or Tim Miller may refer to:

Thomas I. Miller, president of Murray State University
Tim Miller (director), American film director, VFX artist and co-founder of Blur Studio
Tim Miller (ice hockey) (born 1987), American ice hockey player
Tim Miller (performance artist) (born 1958), American performance artist and writer
Tim Miller (poet) (born 1979), American poet and novelist
Tim Miller (politician) (born 1965), American politician and member of the Minnesota House of Representatives
Tim Miller (political strategist) (born 1981), American campaign consultant and critic of Donald Trump
Tim Miller (yoga teacher), director of the Ashtanga Yoga Center in Carlsbad, CA.
Timothy Miller (born 1944), American professor of Religious Studies at the University of Kansas
Timothy Miller, founder and project lead of the Open Graphics Project

See also
Tim Millar, Canadian musician